Huitième Jour (al-Yawm ath-Thāmin), or simply J8, is an Algerian live talk show that debuted 2017 on Echourouk TV. It deals with the news of the week, focusing on media news. It is the local adaptation of the French series Touche pas à mon poste !.

It hosted by Farah Yasmine Nia, with a group of columnists, including Merouane Guerouabi, Zoubir Belhor and Chemseddine Lamrani.

Concept 
The idea of the show is simple: to see or to review striking pictures of the week in the best spirit possible and with good rhythm. But it's not a simple zapping because Farah Yasmine and her team of columnists discuss new or polemical happenings and events without forgetting the pictures to not miss, with some special headings. Two or three guests talk about their life and their favourite show during each J8 episode, and sometimes, it's an opportunity to do some type of challenges.

On-air staff

Host 
J8 will be hosted by Farah Yasmine Nia, who presented entertainment/musical programs Qahwa Hlib Party (2013) on El Djazairia then Zik Mag on KBC. She also participated on the first season of the reality show .

Columnists 
 Merouane Guerouabi, also known as MGDZ, comedian (Bint Walad DZ, Bint Walad 2, Bibiche & Bibicha) and TV host (Fi Darna).
 Zoubir Belhor, comedian (Bibiche & Bibicha) and TV host (Zoubir Show) and reality TV participant (Arab Casting).
 Chemseddine Lamrani, also known as DZjoker, humorist (3leche, DZ Connexion), scenarist (Dar El Bahdja, Sultan Achour 10) and TV host (Hkaytek Hkaya, Fi Darna).

Guests 
The show will generally welcome two guests. They could be hosts, journalists, singers, actors, humorists or politicians.

See also 
 Touche pas à mon poste !

References

External links 
 

2017 Algerian television series debuts
Arabic-language television shows
Echorouk TV original programming